Mohamed Magdi Hamza Khalif (born 30 August 1996) is an Egyptian olympic athlete specialising in the shot put. He won silver medals at the 2018 African Championships and 2015 African Games.

His personal bests are 21.39 metres (Egyptian record) outdoors (Cairo 2016) and 19.35 metres indoors (Jablonec nad Nisou 2017).

International competitions

References

1996 births
Living people
Egyptian male shot putters
Athletes (track and field) at the 2015 African Games
African Games silver medalists for Egypt
Athletes (track and field) at the 2018 Mediterranean Games
Athletes (track and field) at the 2022 Mediterranean Games
African Games medalists in athletics (track and field)
Athletes (track and field) at the 2019 African Games
Competitors at the 2019 Summer Universiade
Mediterranean Games competitors for Egypt
Athletes (track and field) at the 2020 Summer Olympics
Olympic athletes of Egypt
Mediterranean Games medalists in athletics
Mediterranean Games bronze medalists for Egypt